Aethes piercei, the devil's-bit conch, is a species of moth of the family Tortricidae. It is found in central, southern and western Europe. The habitat consists of damp areas, including marshes and fens.

Adults are on wing from June to July.

The larvae feed on Succisa pratensis. They feed in the roots of their host plant.

References

piercei
Moths described in 1952
Moths of Europe